Vinnius is a genus of South American jumping spiders that was first described by Eugène Louis Simon in 1902. The genera Frespera and Arnoliseus were split from this genus in 2002.

Species
 it contains four species, found in Brazil, with one species also found in Argentina:
Vinnius buzius Braul & Lise, 2002 – Brazil
Vinnius camacan Braul & Lise, 2002 – Brazil
Vinnius subfasciatus (C. L. Koch, 1846) (type) – Brazil
Vinnius uncatus Simon, 1902 – Brazil, Argentina

References

Salticidae
Salticidae genera
Spiders of South America